Peter Kennedy Melville (born 11 February 1931) is a former Australian rules football player in the Victorian Football League (VFL).

Ken Melville had his short career at Melbourne during the early period of Melbourne's golden era. He was a member of 1955 and 1956 premiership teams before retiring at the end of the 1956 season.

Melville became a Presbyterian minister, serving in Stepney, London in the 1950s and then at Benalla from 1961 to 1964.

References

External links

1931 births
Living people
Melbourne Football Club players
Keith 'Bluey' Truscott Trophy winners
University Blacks Football Club players
Australian rules footballers from Victoria (Australia)
Australian Presbyterian ministers
Melbourne Football Club Premiership players
Two-time VFL/AFL Premiership players